The RTÉ Sports Team of the Year Award is given on an annual basis to the sporting team or partnership considered to have made the most substantive contribution to sport in that year.

List of winners

Shortlists
The winner is in bold.

2010

 Ireland amateur boxing team
 Cork senior football team
 Republic of Ireland U-17 women's football team
 Dublin senior ladies' football team
 Shamrock Rovers
 Tipperary senior hurling team
 Ireland U-23 cross country team 
 Wexford senior camogie team

2011

 Leinster Rugby
 Dublin senior football team
 Cork women's Gaelic football team
 Republic of Ireland national football team
 Shamrock Rovers
 Kilkenny senior hurling team
 Wexford senior camogie team
 Ireland cricket team

2012

 Donegal senior football team
 Leinster Rugby
 Cork senior ladies' football team
 Ireland at the 2012 Summer Paralympics
 Sligo Rovers
 Kilkenny senior hurling team
 Wexford senior camogie team
 Irish amateur boxing team
 Irish women's cross country team

2014

 Cork senior ladies' football team
 Cork senior camogie team
 Dundalk F.C.
 Ireland national rugby union team
 Kerry Senior Football 
 Kilkenny Senior Hurling

2015

 Dublin footballers, 
 Kilkenny hurlers, 
 Cork camogie, 
 Cork ladies football, 
 Dundalk F.C.
 Ireland women's cricket team, 
 Ireland men's rugby team, 
 Ireland men's hockey team, 
 Irish boxing team, 
 Northern Ireland soccer team, 
 Republic of Ireland soccer team 
 Special Olympics team

2016

 Connacht Rugby
 Cork ladies' footballers
 Dublin footballers
 Dundalk F.C.
 Ireland's Paralympic cycling
 Ireland's Paralympic athletics
 Ireland rugby
 Kilkenny camogie
 Northern Ireland soccer
 Gary O'Donovan and Paul O'Donovan
 Republic of Ireland soccer
 Tipperary hurlers

2020

 Dublin Gaelic footballers
 Dublin ladies footballers
 Kilkenny camogie team
 Leinster rugby
 Limerick hurling team
 Shamrock Rovers

2021

 Galway camogie team
 Katie-George Dunlevy and Eve McCrystal
 Leinster rugby
 Limerick hurling team
 Meath ladies footballers
 Paul O'Donovan and Fintan McCarthy
 Shamrock Rovers
 Tyrone Gaelic footballers
 Aifric Keogh, Eimear Lambe, Fiona Murtagh and Emily Hegarty

See also
 RTÉ Sports Person of the Year

References

Awards established in 2004
Irish sports trophies and awards
Award
 
2004 establishments in Ireland